The Vickers Type 94 Venture was a British army cooperation biplane of the 1920s, designed and built by Vickers, as a development of the Vixen. While six were built for the Royal Air Force, they were found unsuitable and were used for experimental work.

Development and design
The Venture was a further development of the Vixen II to meet the requirements of Air Ministry Specification 45/23, six aircraft being ordered. The Venture, like the Vixen which formed its basis, was a single-bay biplane with a steel tube fuselage and wooden wings. It used the wings of the Vixen II with the lengthened fuselage of the Vixen III. The first Venture flew at the Vickers factory at Brooklands on 3 June 1924, being sent to the Aeroplane and Armament Experimental Establishment at Martlesham for evaluation. While demonstrating what was said to be "docile" handling, further testing showed that the aircraft had poor longitudinal stability, had a long landing run and was considered too large for use in army cooperation, where it would be expected to operate out of small airstrips. While it underwent brief service trials with No. 4 Squadron, the six Ventures were relegated to experimental purposes, the final aircraft being struck off charge in January 1933.

Operators

Royal Air Force

Specifications (Venture)

See also

References

1920s British military reconnaissance aircraft
Venture
Single-engined tractor aircraft
Biplanes
Aircraft first flown in 1924